The West Coast Avengers were created as an expansion of the main Avengers team, when The Vision appointed Hawkeye as the West Coast chair in Avengers vol. 1 #243. Active team members, as of December 2018, are highlighted in bold below.

Founders

Recruits
Avengers members recruited by Hawkeye as the West Coast Avengers chair.

Other recruits

A Fresh Start recruits

Honorary
Heroes that have been granted honorary status during their lifetime or posthumously for acts of great courage and/or sacrifice.

See also
 List of Avengers members

References

Lists of Marvel Comics characters by organization
Lists of Avengers (comics) characters